Oak Trail Shores is an unincorporated community and census-designated place (CDP) in Hood County, Texas, United States. Its population was 2,755 at the 2010 census. It is part of the Granbury micropolitan area as well as the Dallas–Fort Worth metroplex.

Geography
Oak Trail Shores is in northern Hood County at  (32.487266, -97.829874), on the southwest side of Lake Granbury, a reservoir on the Brazos River.

Demographics

2020 census

As of the 2020 United States census, there were 2,979 people, 1,066 households, and 671 families residing in the CDP.

2000 census
As of the 2000 census, there were 2,475 people, 934 households, and 665 families in the CDP, with a population density of 984.8 people per square mile (380.7/km2). There were 1,156 housing units at an average density of 460.0/sq mi (177.8/km2). The CDP's racial makeup was 91.03% White, 0.77% African American, 0.81% Native American, 5.74% from other races, and 1.66% from two or more races. Hispanic or Latino of any race were 17.70% of the population.

There were 934 households, out of which 29.7% had children under the age of 18, 54.7% were married couples living together, 9.7% had a female householder with no husband present, and 28.8% were non-families. 23.7% of all households had one resident, and 9.1% had someone living alone who was 65 years of age or older. The average household size was 2.65 and the average family size was 3.09.

In the CDP, the population consisted of 25.9% under the age of 18, 7.5% from 18 to 24, 29.7% from 25 to 44, 21.6% from 45 to 64, and 15.3% who were 65 years of age and older. The median age was 36 years. For every 100 females, there were 101.5 males. For every 100 females age 18 and over, there were 104.8 males.

The median household income was $25,047, and the median family income $26,077. Median incomes were $24,250 for males and $11,538 for females. The per capita income was $11,665. About 14.6% of families and 18.5% of the population lived below the poverty line, including 27.3% of those under age 18 and 1.9% of those age 65 or over.

Education
Oak Trail Shores is served by the Granbury Independent School District.

References

Granbury micropolitan area
Census-designated places in Hood County, Texas
Census-designated places in Texas